Joakim Stensmo is a Grand Prix motorcycle racer from Sweden.

Career statistics

By season

Races by year

References

Swedish motorcycle racers
Living people
250cc World Championship riders
Year of birth missing (living people)